The consequences of the War of the Pacific were profound and numerous in the countries involved.

Diplomatic changes
After the war, Chile had obtained military hegemony at the Pacific Coast of South America. Chile's expansion was seen with concern across the continent, and Chilean diplomats responded by fomenting rivalries between Chile's neighbors and other South American countries and promoting friendly relationships between countries with disputes with Chile's neighbors. Examples are the Chilean attempts to establish friendly relationships between Ecuador and Colombia, both countries with serious territorial disputes with Peru in the Amazon.

Military co-operation with Ecuador grew considerably, and Chile sent instructors to the military academy in Quito and sold superfluous arms and munitions to Ecuador. Despite Chile's overall good relations with Ecuador, both countries had a minor diplomatic crisis resulting from the capture of the Peruvian torpedo boat Alay in Ecuadorian territorial waters during the war.

Argentina, the only country not at war with Chile despite a common border, had tensions with Chile since but, unlike Peru and Bolivia, successfully maintained peace with Chile but almost fought a war over the border in 1978.

Fate of war loot 

It was only in 2007 that the Chilean government returned almost 4,000 books to Peru's national library, more than a century after they were taken by Chilean soldiers, in the hope of improving the two nations' relations.

Chilean economic boom and decline

As the victor and possessor of a new coastal territory following the War of the Pacific, Chile benefited by gaining a lucrative territory with significant mineral income. The national treasury grew by 900% between 1879 and 1902 because of taxes coming from the newly-acquired lands. British involvement and control of the nitrate industry rose significantly, but from 1901 to 1921, Chilean ownership increased from 15% to 51%. The growth of Chilean economy sustained in its saltpetre monopoly and meant that compared to the previous growth cycle (1832–1873), the economy became less diversified and overly dependent on a single natural resource. In addition, Chilean nitrate, used worldwide as fertilizer, was sensitive to economic downturns, as farmers made cuts on fertilizer use one of their earliest economic measures in the face of economic decline. It has been questioned whether or not the nitrate wealth conquered in the War of the Pacific was a resource curse. During the Nitrate Epoch, the government increased public spending but was accused of squandering money.

Rise of Bolivian and Peruvian anti-Chilean sentiment

Historical and current anti-Chilean resentiment in Bolivia, Peru, and Argentina was caused by the 19th-century Chilean expansionism. The War of the Pacific contributed decisively in the first two of those countries.

In Bolivia, a common political discourse attributes that country's underdevelopment to its loss of seaports in the War of the Pacific becoming a landlocked country. Bolivia lost its Litoral Department and its outlet to the Pacific Ocean, following that war. Currently Chile's huge copper vein in the Atacama Desert, which makes Chile the largest copper exporter in the world, is held in the lands claimed by Bolivia; the same lands lost during the war.

In Peru, a strong anti-Chilean sentiment exists because it lost "a large chunk of its southern territory to Chile" in the War of the Pacific. Peru lost its provinces of Tarapaca and Arica and then suffered the indignity of having its capital, Lima, occupied by Chile at the end of the war and even essentially ransacked.

For Argentina, since they failed to get involved in the conflict and were also colonizing the less inhabited South, mainly in fear of Brazil's possible support for Chile in the war, Chile's victory in the conflict stemmed tensions that Chile was trying to take land from the Argentines. Although that never happened and both finalized their border, both countries remained belligerent and came close to war in 1982. On the other side, Argentina's unsupportive action for Bolivia and Peru also made their relationships very tense, and there is a sense of distrust towards Argentina among many Peruvians and Bolivians.

Rise of superiority ideas
During and after the war there was a rise of racial and national superiority ideas among the Chilean ruling class. Chilean historian Gonzalo Bulnes (son of president Manuel Bulnes) once wrote, "What defeated Peru was the superiority of a race and of a history". During the occupation of Tacna and Arica (1884–1929) the Peruvian people and nation were treated in racist and denigrating terms by the Chilean press. During the war Peruvians were disrespectfully referred to as "cholos" (a slur for persons of mixed European and non-European ancestry) by Chilean officers.

Indigenous peoples
After the occupation of Lima, Chile diverted part of its war efforts to crush Mapuche resistance in the south. Chilean troops coming from Peru entered Araucanía where they in 1881 defeated the last major Mapuche uprising. Chile's newly-acquired Aymara population was seen after the war as a "foreign element" contrasting with the also newly-conquered Mapuches who were seen as "primordial" Chileans. Following the occupation of Lima, Chilean newspapers published extremely patriotic, chauvinist, and expansionistic material. An extreme example of such journalism is Revista del Sur, which stated that firearms obtained in Peru, while useless in the hands of Peruvian "fags" (Spanish: maricas), would be useful by Chileans to "kill indians" (Mapuches).

After the war, the indigenous peoples in Peru became scapegoats in the narratives of Peruvian criollo elites, exemplified in the writing of Ricardo Palma:

The principal cause of the great defeat is that the majority of Peru is composed of that wretched and degraded race that we once attempted to dignify and ennoble. The Indian lacks patriotic sense; he is born enemy of the white and of the man of the coast. It makes no difference to him whether he is a Chilean or a Turk. To educate the Indian and to inspire him a feeling for patriotism will not be the task of our institutions, but of the ages.

Anti-Chinese sentiment in Peru
Because the Chinese supported Chile in the conflict, it had stemmed a sense of Sinophobia in Peru, the first of its kind ever existed in Latin America. Armed indigenous peasants sacked and occupied haciendas of landed elite criollo "collaborationists" in the central Sierra, most of whom were of ethnic Chinese descent, and indigenous and mestizo Peruvians murdered Chinese shopkeepers in Lima. In response, the Chinese coolies revolted and even joined the Chilean Army. In one 1881 pogrom in the Cañete Valley it is estimated that 500 to 1,500 Chinese were killed. Despite this, Chinese were barred from immigrating to the country until 1970s. Even in the 20th century, the memory of Chinese support for Chile was so deep that Manuel A. Odría, a dictator of Peru, banned Chinese immigration as a punishment for their betrayal. Today, however, Sinophobia has been less relevant, and the Chinese are widely accepted as Peruvian citizens, but distrust of China and the Chinese still remains.

Unrest and war trauma in Peru 

The War of the Pacific also sparked an indigenous peasant guerrilla movement throughout the central Sierra against Chileans and collaborationist landlords. In 1884, Cáceres turned against his former guerrilla allies to defend the old order. In 1886 and 1888, the Cáceres sent troops to the central Sierra to disarm the peasants. The lack of rule of law in central sierra was such that in one particular case, a landowner was able to recover his occupied estate only in 1902 after a massive mobilization of military, police, and gunmen.

Rise of war heroes

Eduardo Abaroa

Miguel Grau
Miguel Grau became an important figure in Peru because of his alleged gallantry during the conflict, especially his treatment of Prat's family and rescue of Chilean sailors in Iquique, which gained him recognition as the Caballero de los Mares ("Gentleman of the Seas").

Arturo Prat

Overall

Bolivia 
With the loss of sovereign access to the Pacific Ocean in mind, the 1904 Treaty of Peace and Friendship granted Bolivia the right to tax-free transport of goods and duty-free access to northern Chilean ports. It also obliged the Chilean government to build two rail-lines linking La Paz to Antofagasta and Arica.

Despite the concessions, the loss of the litoral (the coast) remains a deeply-emotional and political issue for Bolivians, as was particularly evident during the 2003 natural gas riots. Undeterred by the seaport concessions granted to Bolivia via the 1904 treaty, Bolivian popular opinion still attributes problems to the landlocked condition, and getting a sovereign piece of the seacoast via Chilean land is often seen as the solution to the problems. Numerous Bolivian presidents pressured Chile for sovereign access to the sea. Diplomatic relations with Chile were severed on March 17, 1978 in spite of considerable commercial ties. The leading Bolivian newspaper El Diario featured at least every week an editorial on the subject, and Bolivians annually celebrate a patriotic "Dia del Mar" (Day of the Sea) to remember the crippling loss.

Chile 

After the war, the Puna de Atacama dispute grew until 1899 since both Chile and Argentina claimed former Bolivian territories. On August 28, 1929, Chile returned the province of Tacna to Peru. In 1999, Chile and Peru at last agreed to implement the Treaty of Lima (1929) fully by providing Peru with a port in Arica.

Peru 
According to Bruce W. Farcau, "in Peru, the wounds run less deep than in neighboring Bolivia". After the War of the Pacific, Peru was left without saltpeter production, the Chilean controlled production decreased to 15%, and production controlled by British investors rose to 55%. According to military historian Robert L. Scheina, the Chilean plunder of Peruvian national literary and art treasures contributed to "demands of revenge among Peruvians for decades." Scholar Brooke Larson pointed out that the War of the Pacific was the "first time since independence wars" that "Peru was invaded, occupied and pillaged by a foreign army" and that "no other Andean republic experienced such a costly and humiliating defeat as Peru did in the hands of Chile".

The war and afterward had profound political and social instability in Peru. The war shook the whole social order of Peru: armed indigenous peasants sacked and occupied haciendas of landed elite criollo "collaborationists" in the central Sierra, Chinese coolies revolted and even joined the Chilean Army, indigenous and mestizo Peruvians murdered Chinese shopkeepers in Lima, Peruvian mobs sacked Chiclayo, and different criollo elite remained deeply divided in opposing camps. The fear of disorder, opposing factions, and armed peasants was for many Peruvians larger than that of the Chilean invaders. In some cases, the delegations of European countries and of the US provided safety during riots and persecutions.

References

Bibliography
 Salazar, Gabriel; Pinto, Julio (2002). Historia contemporánea de Chile III. La economía: mercados empresarios y trabajadores. LOM Ediciones. .
 

War of the Pacific
Pacific